Bree Rakowski (née Robertson, born 6 July 1982) is a model, contortionist and actress who represented Australia in rhythmic gymnastics and was one of the country's top elite international gymnasts.

Robertson, who was born in Gosford, New South Wales, and is, often referred to as Australia's leading contortionist, performs around the world at high-profile events. She appeared in America's Next Top Model, Cycle 11, in 2008, teaching the model contestants about extreme posing.

Sporting career
Robertson was the first Australian individual rhythmic gymnast to ever win a medal in Europe. She did this at the 1999 Julietta Shishmanova Grand Prix in Bourgas, Bulgaria. 

Bree represented Australia at the 1999 World Championships in Osaka, Japan and won 3 gold and 3 silver medals at the Commonwealth Youth Games held in Edinburgh, Scotland in 2000 making her the most decorated Australian athlete of the Games across all sports. 

Bree was named an Australian sporting legend in the book Legends - A Celebration of Australian Women in Sport alongside athletes including Cathy Freeman, Dawn Fraser and Susie O'Neill.

External links
 Official website
 

1982 births
Living people
Australian rhythmic gymnasts
Australian female models
Australian film actresses